Tom Kavanagh (born 21 April 1970) is a former Australian rules footballer who played with Melbourne and Fitzroy  in the Victorian/Australian Football League (VFL/AFL).

Kavanagh is the son of four-time VFL premiership player Brent Crosswell. Although Crosswell played more games for Carlton and North Melbourne, but it was Melbourne who drafted Kavanagh, under the Father-son rule.

He played two senior games for Melbourne in the 1989 VFL season, then returned to his original club Castlemaine, before resuming his league career at Fitzroy, which selected him at pick 22 in the 1993 Mid-Season Draft.

References

External links
 
 

1970 births
Living people
Australian rules footballers from Victoria (Australia)
Melbourne Football Club players
Fitzroy Football Club players
Castlemaine Football Club players